Events in the year 2019 in Bolivia.

Incumbents
 President: Evo Morales (until 10 November), Jeanine Áñez (Interim president) (starting 10 November)
 Vice President: Álvaro García Linera (until 10 November), vacant thereafter

Events
October – Scheduled date for the 2019 Bolivian general election

Deaths
14 January – Gonzalo Ramiro del Castillo Crespo, Roman Catholic prelate, Bishop of Military (b. 1936).
15 January – Mario Monje, politician (b. 1929 or 1930).
18 May – Mario Baudoin, biologist (b. 1942)
25 August – Jenaro Flores Santos, trade unionist and politician, founder of Unified Syndical Confederation of Rural Workers of Bolivia (b. 1942)

See also
 
 2019 Pan American Games

References

 		

 
2010s in Bolivia
Years of the 21st century in Bolivia
Bolivia
Bolivia